Frederick Henninger may refer to:
 F. A. Henninger (1865–1944), architect in Nebraska
 Frederick W. Henninger (1873–1919), American football player and coach